The Harvard Radcliffe Rugby Football Club team is the women's rugby union program that represents Harvard University in Division I tournaments organised by the NCAA. Harvard Radcliffe competes in the Ivy Rugby Conference.

The club began activities in 1982, although the university's first involvement with the sport can be traced to 1874, when Harvard played a two-game series vs Canadian McGill University.

History 
The club was founded in 1982, Harvard women have won]</ref> has won two national championships (1998, 2011) as a club team.

The team won its first collegiate national championship in 1998, also becoming the first champion team to be coached by an all-female staff. Radcliffe finished 15th at national level in 2005, and qualified for nationals at Penn State in 2006. Radcliffe captured the USA Rugby Collegiate Division II National Championship in 2011 after beating UW-LaCrosse, Norwich, Western Washington, and Notre Dame. Following that success, the team was promoted to Division I, joining the recently formed Ivy Rugby Conference.

In 2013, the team became part of NCAA Emerging Sports for Women and Harvard University's 42nd varsity sport, plays other rugby union NCAA teams. Notable honors include: 2019 National Intercollegiate Rugby Association (NIRA) National Champions, Ivy League Champions (2018, 2013), Ivy League Sevens Champions (2016, 2017, 2019)

Facilities 
Radcliffe play their home matches on Roberto A. Mignone Field, located at Harvard's Soldiers Field Park.

References

External links 
 
 

Harvard Crimson rugby
Women's rugby union teams in the United States
Rugby union teams in Boston
Rugby clubs established in 1982
1982 establishments in Massachusetts